Sarah Grace McLaughlin (born 18 July 1992), known professionally as Bishop Briggs, is a British-American singer and songwriter. Her single "River" peaked at number three on the US Alternative Chart. It was included on her debut album, Church of Scars, released on 20 April 2018.

Early life
Sarah Grace McLaughlin was born in London on 18 July 1992, the daughter of Scottish parents from the town of Bishopbriggs, which later inspired her stage name. At the age of four, she moved to Tokyo with her family. She sang in public for the first time at a Tokyo karaoke bar, and realised she wanted to be a performer. Growing up with the city's karaoke bar traditions and hearing music ranging from Motown musicians to The Beatles at home also inspired her to pursue music. She started writing her own songs at the age of seven, and would perform them for her family. She moved to Hong Kong at the age of 10, where she lived until she was 18. She continued to pursue music throughout her youth, participating in a number of school talent shows and performances. After graduating from Hong Kong International School, she moved to Los Angeles and attended college at Musicians Institute.

Career

2015–2017: Debut singles and EP
After moving to Los Angeles, Briggs wrote and played all over the city in any venue she could, eventually recording her first single "Wild Horses" in July 2015. Many listeners found Briggs via Shazam when seeing an Acura commercial which features the song. In late 2015, "Wild Horses" began climbing the charts again, entering the top 30 on the Billboard Alternative Songs chart and top 13 on the Billboard Twitter Emerging Artist charts.

In January 2016, Briggs released the single "River". The song was a commercial success. The song reached number 1 on Hype Machine's Popular charts and on Spotify's US Viral 50 and No. 2 on the Global Viral 50. It also received an Honorable Mention on Shazam's predicted Songs of the Summer 2016, which was featured in Billboard.  "River" climbed into the top 3 on the 'Billboard Alternative Songs chart and top 10 on the Billboard Hot Rock, Rock Airplay and Twitter Emerging Artist charts.

In May 2016, she released her third single, "The Way I Do". She was the opening act for Coldplay in the fall of 2016 on nine of their tour dates, and also opened for Kaleo throughout their fall tour. Briggs made her television debut on 1 August 2016, performing "River" on The Tonight Show Starring Jimmy Fallon. She released her fourth single, "Pray (Empty Gun)" on 12 August 2016. The song was featured in the season 2 finale of the MTV show Scream. On 23 September 2016, Briggs released the single "Be Your Love". Her first physical release was a self-titled 12" vinyl EP in a limited-edition run of 1,200 copies, released on Record Store Day Black Friday in 2016.

In December 2016, Briggs released the official video for "Wild Horses" through W Magazine.

Bishop Briggs opened on the main stage at the 2017 Panorama Festival in New York City and played Coachella 2017. Briggs contributed to the soundtrack of xXx: Return of Xander Cage with her song "Mercy". She featured in Cold War Kids' song "So Tied Up", released in March 2017.

Briggs' self-titled EP was re-released digitally on 14 April 2017, featuring four songs released on the vinyl EP and two previously unreleased songs, "Dark Side" and "The Fire". In 2020, "Dark Side" was heard in Avengers (2020 video game).

2018: Church of Scars
In February 2018, Republic Records released Briggs' cover version of the 1988 INXS hit "Never Tear Us Apart" as a single cut from the soundtrack to the film Fifty Shades Freed, which she also sang as part of a duet on Season 16 of American Idol.

Briggs' debut album, Church of Scars, was released on 20 April 2018.

2019: Champion
In October 2019, Briggs released three songs as singles ("Champion", "Tattooed On My Heart" and "Jekyll & Hide") from her second studio album, Champion. In November, Briggs released the song "Someone Else" as part of the album. The album was then released on 8 November.

Discography

Studio albums

Extended plays

Singles

Guest appearances

Notes

Awards and nominations

References

External links

 
 
 
 Review of Church of Scars on Slant

21st-century English singers
English songwriters
Island Records artists
Singers from California
People from Los Angeles
Living people
1992 births
Singers from London
English people of Scottish descent
Anglo-Scots
Bishopbriggs
21st-century English women singers
21st-century American singers